"Quicksand" is a song by English synth-pop duo La Roux from their eponymous debut studio album (2009). Written and produced by Elly Jackson and Ben Langmaid, the song was released as the album's lead single on 15 December 2008 by Kitsuné. It peaked at number 153 on the UK Singles Chart upon limited release. When re-released on 23 November 2009, the single re-entered the chart at number 129.

Song information
Jackson told The London Paper that the song is about "having an intense moment with someone, when maybe you're watching a film or listening to music, and both of you are yearning for the other one, and it's almost painful to sit next to them."

Critical reception
"Quicksand" was met with critical acclaim. Digital Spy music editor Nick Levine wrote that "[l]ike most of the songs on their debut album, it's a winning combination of pop smarts, stifling romantic obsession and production that mixes the sounds of '82 with the sonic punch of '09." Alexis Petridis of The Guardian commented that "the sparse dynamics and stabbing synthesisers of 'Quicksand' offer a reminder that not every aspect of the 80s has been mined to exhaustion in recent years." Peter Paphides of The Times called the song "superb" and added, "Propelled along by a melody that shares some of its DNA with Prince's 'When Doves Cry', Jackson casts herself as the recipient of an overture from someone already in a relationship."

John Murphy, writing for musicOMH, described the song as "instantly addictive and catchy", while stating that "unlike a lot of electro acts out there, 'Quicksand' has real heart and emotion to it as well—certainly not a case of style over substance." AllMusic's Heather Phares noted that the track "uses a relentlessly tight arrangement and Jackson's frosty soulfulness to give the song's obsession a shot of excitement." Luke Turner of NME referred to "Quicksand" as "liquid-mercury-smooth but pierced by sharp vocals."

Music video
The music video of "Quicksand" was directed by Kinga Burza. It was released on YouTube on 13 January 2009. The video shows Jackson on a tropical island with pineapples and the sun setting. Girls are dancing. Jackson is seen with a parrot on her shoulder, singing. It mostly features Jackson singing with the sun setting behind her.

Track listings

Original release

French 12-inch single
A1. "Quicksand" (Original) – 3:07
A2. "Quicksand" (autoKratz Drags to Riches Mix) – 4:44
B1. "Quicksand" (Beni's Sinking at 1.56 Mix) – 4:20
B2. "Quicksand" (Chateau Marmont Remix) – 3:34

French digital EP
"Quicksand" – 3:07
"Quicksand" (AutoKratz Drags to Riches Mix) – 4:42
"Quicksand" (Beni's Sinking at 1.56 Mix) – 4:18
"Quicksand" (Chateau Marmont Remix) – 3:32
"Quicksand" (Joe and Will Ask? Remix) – 5:01

UK digital single
"Quicksand" (Standard Version) – 3:05

US EP and digital EP
"Quicksand" (Original Version) – 3:06
"Quicksand" (Mad Decent Remix No. 1) – 5:07
"In for the Kill" (Skream's Let's Get Ravey Remix) – 5:02

US 12-inch single
A1. "Quicksand" – 3:08
A2. "Quicksand" (Mad Decent Mix No. 1) – 5:10
A3. "Quicksand" (Instrumental) – 3:08
B1. "In for the Kill" (Skream's Let's Get Ravey Remix) – 5:04
B2. "In for the Kill" (Instrumental) – 4:08

Re-release

UK CD single
"Quicksand" – 3:07
"Quicksand" (Boy 8 Bit Remix) – 5:58
"Quicksand" (Beni's Sinking at 1.56 Mix) – 4:19

UK limited-edition 7-inch single
A. "Quicksand" - 3:07

UK digital EP
"Quicksand" – 3:07
"Quicksand" (Boy 8 Bit Remix) – 5:58
"Quicksand" (Alex Metric Remix) – 6:26
"Quicksand" (Mad Decent Remix No. 1) – 5:12

Credits and personnel
Credits adapted from the liner notes of La Roux.

Recording and management
 Recorded at Elfin Studios (Teddington, London)
 Mixed at Mr Dan's (London)
 Published by Big Life Music Ltd.

Personnel
 Elly Jackson – vocals, production
 Ben Langmaid – production
 Dan Carey – mixing

Charts

Release history

References

2008 debut singles
2008 songs
Cherrytree Records singles
Interscope Records singles
Kitsuné singles
La Roux songs
Polydor Records singles